is a Japanese voice actress affiliated with 81 Produce.

Filmography
Blue Drop: Tenshi-tachi no Gikyoku (TV) as Kangofu
Chocotto Sister (Takeshi's mother)
Elizabeth (ep 44); Shin-chan (ep 65)
Emily of New Moon (Carrie Strang)
Engage Planet Kiss Dum (others)
Fighting Beauty Wulong (Chie)
Gintama (Child; Child B ; Girl A; Itou Kamotarou (Young); Little Elizabeth; Shin-chan)
Glass Mask (Yasuko)
Hanamaru Kindergarten (TV) as Aoi's mother
Kobato. (TV) (ep 2)
Naruto Shippuden (Mabui)
Nodame Cantabile (Maiko Aizawa)
Nodame Cantabile: Paris (TV) as Girlfriend (ep 5)
Tona-Gura! (Chihaya Suzuhara)
Toaru Kagaku no Railgun (TV) as Children (ep 1)
Yoku Wakaru Gendai Mahō (TV) as Boy (ep 7); Homeroom teacher (ep 1)

Drama CDs
EX!（Eriko Izumi）
NAKED BLACK（Setsuna）
Chrome Breaker （Kaede）
Tona-Gura!（Chihaya Suzuhara）
Tona-Gura!『神楽家SIDE』（Chihaya Suzuhara）

Discography
 Tona-Gura! kagetsu&chihara
 Tona-Gura! DRAMATIC☆GIRLY
 Tona-Gura! Tonarigurashi Discography!

References

Profile at 81 Produce
声優・関山美沙紀の『もっちりブログ』(Official Blog)
Tokyo Anime Center ~Voice Actors' Day~ (Japanese)

Japanese voice actresses
81 Produce voice actors
Living people
1981 births